Li Junfeng (born 8 August 1997) is a Chinese footballer currently playing as a full-back for Meizhou Hakka.

Club career
Li Junfeng would go abroad to Portugal to start his professional career with Gondomar and especially the Gondomar B team before returning to China with second tier club Wuhan Zall on 30 June 2017. With them he would make his debut in a league game on 1 July 2017 against Baoding Yingli ETS that ended in a 2-2 draw. After a handful of games he returned to Portugal and played for SC Coimbrões and Padroense before going back to China again when he joined second tier club Meizhou Hakka on 24 February 2020. Making his debut in a league game on 20 September 2020 against Jiangxi Liansheng that ended in a 4-0 victory. After the game he would be utilized squad player and was part of the team that gained promotion to the top tier after coming second within the division at the end of the 2021 China League One campaign.

Career statistics
.

References

External links

1997 births
Living people
Chinese footballers
Chinese expatriate footballers
Association football defenders
China League One players
Campeonato de Portugal (league) players
Guangzhou City F.C. players
Gondomar S.C. players
Wuhan F.C. players
Padroense F.C. players
Meizhou Hakka F.C. players
Chinese expatriate sportspeople in Portugal
Expatriate footballers in Portugal
21st-century Chinese people